The complete list of University of Texas at Austin presidents officially includes 28 individuals in the history of the University.  The office of the president was originally established in 1895.

The position did not exist back when the University was established in 1883.  The founders of the University had decided to follow the example of University of Virginia, where Thomas Jefferson, a skeptic of central authority and bureaucracy, had prevented the establishment of such an office years before.  The faculty would retain control, under the regents, through an annually selected chairman.

John William Mallet, a professor of physics, served as the first chairman of the faculty for one year, starting in 1883.  Mallet was followed by William LeRoy Broun, who served only briefly.  Leslie Waggener received the position in 1884, and served until 1894.  Waggener subsequently served as president ad interim until his death in 1896.  George Tayloe Winston, who took over in 1896, is officially considered the first president of The University of Texas.

President Logan Wilson concurrently served as acting chancellor in 1954, until the chancellorship was abolished in September of that year.  The position was re-instated in 1960, upon which Wilson left the presidency to become chancellor.  In 1963, the office of the president itself was abolished.  The chancellor of The University of Texas System, Harry Ransom, assumed the duties of the presidency until the position's re-establishment in 1967.

Presidents

References

 
Texas At Austin
University of Texas at Austin presidents